Semyon Alekseevich Treskunov (born 14 November 1999) is a Russian actor. He appeared in more than ten films since 2012.

Early life
Semyon Treskunov was born in Moscow, Russia. 
His mother, Marina Treskunova, is a regional representative of OWL children's magazine, and his father, Aleksey Treskunov, has his own company which does transfer graphics.
At school the boy constantly participated in creative competitions, and also was fond of swimming. His parents played a great role in the choice of his career path and in the success he achieved.

Career
Semyon's film debut took place in 2010. His mother took the 10-year-old Semyon for casting at MTS advertising, which he successfully passed. Before that, there was a year of vain attempts at various advertising castings. In the winter of 2011 he was offered the role of a substitute in the film State of Emergency (2012) by Vsevolod Benigsen. 
However, seeing Semyon, the director gave him the whole role, which was the first in his filmography. Then followed the role in the film The Night Guest (2011) by Stanislav Nazirov, where Semyon played the son of the main character Kirill.

In the summer of the same year he played in the criminal thriller Steel Butterfly (2012) by Renat Davletyarov in the small but prominent role of the homeless boy Karlik.

In the winter of 2012 came the anthology film Moms (2012), where Treskunov starred in the segment "Operatsiya Mama". Then followed a series of roles in various television series that went unnoticed.
In the film I Give You My Word (2013) by Aleksandr Karpilovsky, Semyon played the main role - the pioneer Mishka Khrustalev. The picture was not successful at the big box office, but was warmly received by critics. In particular, the film itself and Semyon received many prizes at various film festivals.
He also took part in the television series Traffic Light (2013–14) and Family Business (2014).

The picture directed by Vladimir Kott On the Bottom (2014), based on Maxim Gorky's eponymous play, was first shown in 2014 at the festival "Window to Europe" — in this film Semyon played Luka. The modernized adaptation got a mixed reception. The role of Semyon, did not go unnoticed and gathered mostly positive reviews.

In the summer of 2014, the shooting of the fantasy-comedy Ghost by Alexander Voitinsky was finished in Moscow, where Semyon acted opposite Fyodor Bondarchuk. The actor played the role of a "mama's boy" despised by classmates, who begins to pursue the ghost of a deceased aircraft designer. Work in this picture, released on the screens in March of next year, was recognized by film critics as a great creative achievement of Treskunov.

In 2016 the film The Good Boy was released, where Semyon played the main role. Other actors included Konstantin Khabensky and Mikhail Yefremov. The picture was praised by critics and it received the Grand Prix at the 27th Kinotavr.

Selected filmography

Film

Television

References

External links

 

1999 births
Living people
Russian male child actors
Russian male film actors
Russian male television actors
Male actors from Moscow
21st-century Russian male actors